Britain's Great Little Railways is a company, created in 1994, to provide an umbrella organisation for the owners and operators of the miniature and narrow gauge railways in Great Britain and the Isle of Man. Its members include purely commercial operators and heritage railways with long histories, such as the Rhyl Miniature Railway which celebrated its centenary in 2011.

Administration
The company is run on a not for profit basis with four directors who are volunteers chosen from and elected by the members. The stated aim of the company is to share knowledge and information and to improve the safety of the members railways. It is a corporate member of the Heritage Railway Association.

Meetings
Two members meetings are held each year in March and October at a member railway. The company publishes posters, leaflets an e magazine and a website about its member railways. In 2011 there are over 30 member railways spread across the UK.

Members
, the organisation comprises the following railways:

 Barnards Miniature Railway
 Beer Heights Light Railway
 Bekonscot Railway
 Bentley Miniature Railway
 Bickington Steam Railway
 Brookside Miniature Railway
 Bure Valley Railway
 Cleethorpes Coast Light Railway
 East Herts Miniature Railway
 Eastleigh Lakeside Steam Railway
 Evesham Vale Light Railway
 Exbury Gardens Steam Railway
 Fairbourne Railway
 Fancott Miniature Railway
 Fenn Bell Miniature Railway
 Ferry Meadows Railway
 Foxfield Miniature Railway
 Great Cockcrow Railway
 Great Laxey Mine Railway
 Grosvenor Park Miniature Railway
 Hambleton Valley Miniature Railway
 Hollycombe-Steam in the Country
 Hotham Park Railway
 Kirklees Light Railway
 Littlehampton Miniature Railway
 Moors Valley Railway
 Mortocombe Railway
 North Bay Railway
 Perrygrove Railway
 Rhiw Valley Railway
 Rhyl Miniature Railway
 Romney, Hythe & Dymchurch Railway
 Rudyard Lake Steam Railway
 Sherwood Forest Railway
 Shibden Miniature Railway
 South Downs Light Railway
 Stansted Park Light Railway
 Strawberry Line Miniature Railway
 Summerfields Miniature Railway
 Swanley New Barn Railway
 Thompson Park Railway
 Wells & Walsingham Light Railway
 Weston Park Railway
 Woking Miniature Railway

See also
 Great Little Trains of Wales
 Heritage Railway Association

References 

 Britains Great Little Railways Ltd registered in England 3143331

External links 
 Official Britains Great Little Railways website

 
Narrow gauge railways in the United Kingdom